Merlin Properties is a Spanish real estate company, structured as a REIT.  It is based in Madrid and listed on the Madrid Stock Exchange. It was founded in 2014 by former executives of Deutsche Bank. With the initial support of international investment funds like BlackRock, Principal Financial Group, Marketfield and Invesco it acquired more than 1,000 offices from BBVA. It later acquired the real estate division of Sacyr (Testa) and Metrovacesa. It is a component of the IBEX 35 since 2015.

References

External links
 

Real estate companies of Spain
Companies listed on the Madrid Stock Exchange
IBEX 35